Mehleban (also Romanized as Mehlebān and Mehlabān) is a village in Emamzadeh Abdollah Rural District, Dehferi District, Fereydunkenar County, Mazandaran Province, Iran. At the 2006 census, its population was 1,593, in 400 families.

References 

Populated places in Fereydunkenar County